This is a comprehensive discography of official recordings by Incubus, an American rock band from Calabasas, California. To date, they have sold over 13 million albums worldwide, with over 8 million in the United States alone.

Albums

Studio albums

Compilation albums

Live albums

Demo albums

Video albums

EPs

Singles

Promotional singles

Music videos

Cover songs
Incubus has covered the following songs:

Demo songs
 "Bathe In My Snot"
 "Damnation?"
 "Miss Bliss"
 "Pillow Your Eyes"
 "Purple Kool-Aid"
 "Speak Free (Demo)"
 "Shaft (Demo)"
 "Calgone (Demo)"
 "Glass (Instrumental Demo)"
 "The Warmth (Instrumental Demo)"

Soundtrack appearances
 Spawn: The Original Soundtrack (1997)
 "Familiar" (with featuring. DJ Greyboy)
 Urban Legend (1998)
 "Redefine" (previously appeared on S.C.I.E.N.C.E.)
 Scream 3 (2000)
 "Crowded Elevator"
 Little Nicky (2000)
 "Pardon Me" (previously appeared on Make Yourself)
 Dragon Ball Z: Bardock - The Father of Goku (2002)
 "Nowhere Fast" (previously appeared on Make Yourself)
 Final Destination 2 (2003)
 "Vitamin" (previously appeared on S.C.I.E.N.C.E.)
 Halo 2: The Original Soundtrack (2004)
 "The Odyssey" (a four movement epic that totals 27 minutes long)
 Stealth: The Original Soundtrack (2005)
 "Make a Move"
 "Admiration"
 "Neither of Us Can See" (duet with Chrissie Hynde)
 "Aqueous Transmission" (previously appeared on Morning View)
 Surf's Up (2007)
 "Drive" (previously appeared on Make Yourself)
 Hancock (2008)
 "Beware! Criminal" (previously appeared on A Crow Left of the Murder...)

Other appearances
 Family Values Tour 1998 (1998)
 "New Skin (Live)"
 Strait Up (2000)
 "Divided (An Argument for the Soul)"
 X-Fest (2000)
 "Pardon Me" (Live)
 Live in the X Lounge (2000 and 2004)
 "Pardon Me" (Live) • Live in the X Lounge III
 "Talk Shows On Mute" (Live) • Live in the X Lounge VII
 Loud Rocks (2000)
 "Still Not a Player" (with Big Pun)
 End Sessions, Vol. 2: The End 107.7 (2000)
 "Pardon Me" (Live)
 Y100 Sonic Sessions (2000 and 2001)
 "Pardon Me" (Live) • Y100 Sonic Sessions 4
 "Drive" (Live) • Y100 Sonic Sessions 5
 WIIL Rock 95.1 Live CD (2001)
 "Pardon Me" (Live)
 Live X (2001 and 2004)
 "Drive" (Live) • Live X 7 – Black and White World
 "Message in a Bottle" (Live) (The Police cover) • Live X 9: Joyride
 Swallow My Eggnog (2001)
 "Get Your Dreidel On" (as Pudie Tadow)
 Visions: All Areas Vol. 129 (2011)
 "Surface to Air"

Notes

References 

Discography
Discographies of American artists
Rock music group discographies